San Pelayo is a town and municipality located in the Córdoba Department, northern Colombia.

See also 
 San Pelayo, Gandara, Samar, Philippines

References

 Gobernacion de Cordoba - San Pelayo
 San Pelayo official website

Municipalities of Córdoba Department